Retta Young was a singer who released an album and 3 singles during the 1970s. She is remembered for her 1975 disco hit "Sending Out An S.O.S.".

Background
In the 1960s she was a member of The Superbs, and  The Devotions.
In the mid-70s she was with the All-Platinum label which also included Sylvia and The Moments.

She was married to Ray, Goodman & Brown member, Al Goodman. She was originally introduced to her future husband by producer / composer Paul Kyser.

Releases
In 1975, her single "Sending Out An S.O.S." was released on the All Platinum label, #AP-2355. It debuted for the week ending May 31, 1975. It Peaked at No. 88 on the U.S. R&B charts and No. 28 in the U.K. For the week ending June 14, 1975 "Sending Out An S.O.S." was rated No. 9 for The Top Audience Response In N.Y. Discos. The top 3 were "The Hustle" by Van McCoy at No. 3, El Bimbo by Bimbo Jet at No. 2, and No. 1 was "Free Man" by South Shore Commission. Record sales in New York record stores showed it at No. 7 at Colony Records, and No. 1 at Downstairs Records.

In 1978, "My Man Is On His Way" backed with "Really, Really" was released. It is featured on the 2014 compilation album, Disco: A Fine Selection of Independent Disco, Modern Soul and Boogie 1978-82.

In May 2017, her 1977 album Young And Restless was released on the Expansion Records label in both vinyl LP and CD formats. The CD version includes bonus non-album tracks.

Discography

The Devotions

The Devotions were a female group from New York. They had recorded for the Colossus Records. As reported in the June 19, 1971 edition of Billboard, they were to be exclusively with the Silver Dollar Label, which was owned by Paul Kyser. The single "Dawning Of Love" bw "So Glad You're Home" which they recorded for Colossus was written By Kyser as well as co-produced by him and Tom Vetri.

Henrietta Young, Bertha Addison and Madge Quince are credited with composing "Stuck To You Like A Magnet". Retta Young's first Devotions recording was "The Saga Of Will-E Jones" which was released in 1971. It was composed by Paul Kyser and Tom Vetri, and released on the Silver Dollar Records label. The single "Dawning Of Love" bw "So Glad You're Home" predates that release. It was released in 1970. This suggests that Retta Young didn't sing on the earlier release.

Membership
An early member of the group was Rhonda Franklin. She left the group at some stage and the line-up consisted of Phillis  Harris and her sister, and another lady called Arnita.  At that time the group were with Symbol Records and their personal management was by Kay-Vee productions. Somewhere between the group changing from The Superbs to The Devotions, the line up changed and Henrietta Young, Bertha Addison and Madge Quince replaced the previous line up. Later on Paul Kyser used a different line-up of girl singers to perform as Devotion.

Discography

References

20th-century American singers
1949 births
20th-century African-American women singers
All Platinum artists
Living people
20th-century American women singers
21st-century African-American people
21st-century African-American women